Manoel dos Santos Filho (born 8 July 1980), commonly known as Itaparica, is a former Brazilian-born Hong Kong professional football player who played as an attacking midfielder. He last played for Hong Kong Premier League club R&F.

Club career

South China
Itaparica played in Campeonato Brasileiro Série A for several clubs including Cruzeiro, Avai and Portuguesa. He joined South China and made his debut for the team on the away league game against Lanwa Redbull on 15 September 2007, where the team won by 3–1. He scored his first goal for the team in the league match against Workable on 26 September 2007, where the team won by 6–1.

Pegasus
Since the 2009–10 season, Itaparica has been top scorer in Hong Kong three years in a row (currently leading the table). It was an outstanding achievement considering he played most of the time as an attacking midfielder for TSW Pegasus. He is able to score in all competitions he played with an amazing scoring percentage nearly 60%. With such superb and consistence performance he was named 'Hong Kong Best Eleven' in last 3 seasons. This article was not written by his agent.

South China
In the 2012–13 season, Itaparica rejoined South China.

Eastern
On 11 June 2013, Eastern Salon announced their 22-men squad for the following season. Itaparica joined them after South China opted not to extend his contract.

South China
Itaparica rejoins South China for the third time in summer 2014.

Tai Po
After a season with China League One club Xinjiang Tianshan Leopard, Itaparica decided to return to Hong Kong. He signed with HKPL side Tai Po on 30 December 2016. On 18 March, Itaparica collided with a Southern player during a Premier League match. He sprained his right knee and was subsequently ruled out for six weeks. He returned in time for Tai Po's Sapling Cup Final match against Pegasus on 3 May during which he won his first trophy since returning to Hong Kong.

R&F
In July 2017, the South China Morning Post reported that Itaparica would join R&F.

On 19 June 2019, head coach Yeung Ching Kwong revealed that Itaparica would not be retained. He announced his retirement from football after the season on 30 August 2019 and returned to Brazil in November of the same year.

International career
Itaparica was born and raised in Brazil. In September 2014, Itaparica applied for the HKSAR passport and was granted one on 4 November 2015. As a result, he became eligible to play for the Hong Kong national team. On 31 December 2015, he earned his first cap for the national team during the 38th Guangdong–Hong Kong Cup, an unofficial tournament.

On 3 January 2016, Itaparica scored his first goal for the national team. He made his formal debut for Hong Kong in a FIFA World Cup qualifying 2-0 loss against Qatar in March of that year.

Career statistics

Club
As of 14 July 2017

Honours
Pegasus
 Hong Kong FA Cup: 2009–10

South China
 Hong Kong First League: 2012–13

Eastern
 Hong Kong FA Cup: 2013–14

Tai Po
 Hong Kong Sapling Cup: 2016–17

References

External links
 
 Itaparica at HKFA
 F&Z Sports Brazil: ITAPARICA

1980 births
Living people
Sportspeople from Bahia
Hong Kong people of Brazilian descent
Hong Kong footballers
Hong Kong international footballers
Brazilian footballers
Brazilian expatriate footballers
Association football midfielders
Brazilian emigrants to Hong Kong
Brazilian expatriate sportspeople in Hong Kong
Brazilian expatriate sportspeople in China
Hong Kong expatriate sportspeople in China
Expatriate footballers in Hong Kong
Expatriate footballers in China
China League One players
Hong Kong First Division League players
Hong Kong Premier League players
Tai Po FC players
Brasília Futebol Clube players
Cruzeiro Esporte Clube players
Associação Atlética Portuguesa (Santos) players
Avaí FC players
Associação Atlética Anapolina players
Paysandu Sport Club players
South China AA players
TSW Pegasus FC players
Eastern Sports Club footballers
Xinjiang Tianshan Leopard F.C. players
R&F (Hong Kong) players
Hong Kong expatriate footballers
Naturalized footballers of Hong Kong
Hong Kong League XI representative players